Trunov is a Russian masculine surname, its feminine counterpart is Trunova. Notable people with the surname include:

Ihor Trunov
Svetlana Trunova (born 1983), Russian skeleton racer 

Russian-language surnames